Major General Charles Stewart Farnsworth (October 29, 1862 – December 19, 1955) was a United States Army officer and civic leader.

Early life
Farnsworth was born in Lycoming County, Pennsylvania and attended local public schools. He worked for Western Union and the Bell Telephone company before being appointed to the United States Military Academy (USMA) at West Point, New York in 1883.

Military career
Among his fellow classmates there included several general officers of the future, such as Charles Gerhardt, Mark L. Hersey, Nathaniel Fish McClure, Michael Joseph Lenihan, Herman Hall, William Weigel, Ernest Hinds, Ulysses G. McAlexander, James Theodore Dean, Frank Herman Albright, Marcus Daniel Cronin, George Owen Squier, Thomas Grafton Hanson, George Washington Gatchell, Alexander Lucian Dade and Edmund Wittenmyer.

After graduating, Farnsworth was sent to various posts in the Great Plains. He was stationed at Fort Sisseton in South Dakota, Fort Shaw in Montana, and Fort Buford in North Dakota. In 1893 he became Professor of Military Science and Tactics at the University of North Dakota. In addition to his teaching job, Farnsworth was also head coach of the school's football team from 1895 to 1896.

During the Spanish–American War, Farnsworth served as a quartermaster in Cuba and was an aide to Adna Chaffee.

After the war, Farnsworth was sent to Alaska where he founded and constructed Fort Gibbon. He was then sent to the Philippines where he founded and built Fort William McKinley. He also expanded the cantonments at the Presidio of San Francisco.

In 1909, he attended the U.S. Army Command and General Staff School. He graduated from the U.S. Army War College in 1916.

During the Pancho Villa Expedition into Mexico, Farnsworth served as a battalion commander and supply base commander.

Farnsworth was the commandant of the U.S. Army Infantry Training School at Fort Sill shortly after the American entry into World War I in April 1917. He then commanded the 159th Infantry Brigade, part of the 80th Infantry Division, at Camp Lee, Virginia. In 1918, Farnsworth was promoted to major general and placed in command of the 37th Infantry Division of the Ohio Army National Guard. Dana T. Merrill was the division's chief of staff. He brought the division to the Western Front, where it participated in the Battle of Saint-Mihiel and the Meuse–Argonne offensive.

For his service during World War I, Farnsworth received the Army Distinguished Service Medal and the Silver Star medal. The citation for his Army DSM reads:

While the Silver Star citation reads as follows:

He also received the Croix de Guerre with Palm and the Legion of Honor from France. From Belgium, he received the Order of Léopold.

After World War I, he commanded Camp Bowie, Texas before being ordered to Fort Benning, Georgia. There, Farnsworth organized the U.S. Army Infantry School and served as its first commandant. In July 1920, Farnsworth became Chief of Infantry. He served in that position until his retirement in 1925. As Chief of Infantry, Farnsworth traveled around the country inspecting reserve units and R.O.T.C. programs. He also reviewed reports by junior officers George S. Patton and Dwight D. Eisenhower on infantry tactics and the use of armor. Farnsworth dismissed both reports and retired from the army on March 27, 1925.

Later life and civic leadership
Farnsworth and his wife moved to Altadena, California after his retirement and lived on Las Flores Drive, close to his son. They became involved in the community. Gen. Farnsworth was the president of the Altadena Citizens' Association and the Altadena Beautification League. He sat as president of the board of the La Vina Sanitorium. He was also a member of the Los Angeles County Planning Commission and the Criminal Complaints Committee of the Los Angeles County Grand Jury.

In 1931, Farnsworth was Grand Marshal of the Tournament of Roses and was one of a few to ride a horse down the parade route in modern times.

Farnsworth was instrumental in the creation of Altadena Park in 1934. Farnsworth led the fundraising, designed the park, and supervised its grading and landscaping. The park was renamed in his honor in 1939.

His wife died in 1951. He died in 1955 at the Naval Hospital in Norco, California. They are both buried at the cemetery at the Presidio of San Francisco.

The Farnsworth Family Papers (Robert J. Farnsworth and Charles S. Farnsworth) collection is housed in the Rasmuson Library Archives, University of Alaska Fairbanks.

Personal life
While at Fort Shaw, he married Laura Galey. They had one son, Robert. She died in 1890.

In 1894, he married Helen Bosard of Grand Forks, North Dakota. They had no children.

Head coaching record

References

Additional reading
 "Milestones". Time, January 2, 1956, p. 57.
 "In Memory". Assembly, Association of Graduates, U.S.M.A. West Point, New York: United States Military Academy, Vol. XV, No. 1, April 1956, p. 57.
 Peterson, Robert H. Altadena's Golden Years Alhambra, California: Sinclair Printing and Litho, Inc. 1976.
 "Rose Parade Head Named". Los Angeles Times, December 16, 1930 Part II, p. 2.
 Zack, Michele. Altadena: Between Wilderness and City Altadena, California: Altadena Historical Society, 2004

External links

|-

1862 births
1955 deaths
People from Lycoming County, Pennsylvania
United States Military Academy alumni
Military personnel from Pennsylvania
United States Army Infantry Branch personnel
North Dakota Fighting Hawks football coaches
American military personnel of the Spanish–American War
United States Army Command and General Staff College alumni
United States Army War College alumni
United States Army generals of World War I
Recipients of the Silver Star
Recipients of the Distinguished Service Medal (US Army)
Recipients of the Legion of Honour
Recipients of the Croix de Guerre 1914–1918 (France)
United States Army generals
People from Altadena, California
Burials at San Francisco National Cemetery